Xylophanes vagliai is a moth of the  family Sphingidae. It is known from Ecuador.

It is similar to Xylophanes aristor and Xylophanes rhodochlora. The forewings are relatively short and broad, with an almost straight outer margin. The anterior half of the thorax upperside is separated from the remainder by a fine white line. The tegula are edged in grey along the inner margin. There is also a median line of grey scales. The upperside of the abdomen has a broad, grey dorsal stripe and the lateral stripe is vivid yellow. The forewing upperside is similar to Xylophanes rhodochlora, but the ground colour is bronzy green with pearly reflections, the discal spot is smaller and the first and fourth postmedian lines are darker green, highlighted along their inner edges in pearly grey. The fringe is orange. The marginal area of the forewing underside is of the same general brick-red colour as the rest of the wing, barely delineated by a grey line. Females are identical to males, but the antennae are thinner and the forewing is broader and more rounded.

There are probably at least two generations per year.

References

vagliai
Moths described in 2003
Endemic fauna of Ecuador
Fauna of Ecuador
Moths of South America
Insects of South America